Monty Munford (born 4 June 1961) is an English-born tech journalist.

Career 
Munford worked for several years as a motorbike dispatch-rider in London, before retraining as a journalist at the London College of Printing in 1998.

Writing 
From 2015-2019 Munford was a tech columnist for Forbes in New York and The Telegraph in London. He has also contributed to TechCrunch, Mashable, Fast Company, The Huffington Post, Wired. MIT Technology Review, The Independent, The Inquirer, The Guardian, The Observer, Financial Times, and The Times of India. He has a Google News-verified tech blog, Mob76 Outlook.

He has interviewed Apple co-founder Steve Wozniak, John McAfee, and Roger Ver.

In August 2019, Munford reported that he had been defrauded of £25,000 in cryptocurrency, mainly Bitcoin and Ethereum, when his private keys were stolen from his Gmail account.
 
Munford has also written and self-published The Dust Bowls of Maturity.

Business
In 2005 Munford joined mobile media games publisher and distributor Player X having previously worked for mobile game testing house Babel Media. Munford left Player X to devote his time to connecting UK and Indian mobile content providers working with in Paramount and FC Liverpool, as well as to pursue acting in Bollywood.

In 2011, he returned to the UK and set up his own consultancy Mob76. Mob76 works with companies to help them raise money, raise their profile, connect with the right network and eventually exit via acquisition.

Acting 
Munford has acted in two Bollywood films: as a 1930s British officer for the Ashutosh Gowariker film Khelein Hum Jee Jaan Sey, and as a Russian gangster in the Rohan Sippy film Dum Maro Dum.

References

External links 
 Mob76 Outlook

English male film actors
Living people
English male journalists
1961 births